The Eudora Plantation, also known as the Old Jones Place, was a historic building in Brooks County, Georgia. It is believed to have been designed by architect John Wind and built in 1835, though contemporary records are lacking. The HBO movie As Summers Die starring Jamie Lee Curtis and Bette Davis was filmed at the house in 1985.

It was listed on the U.S. National Register of Historic Places in 1974 and destroyed by fire in February 1987.

References

 

Houses on the National Register of Historic Places in Georgia (U.S. state)
Greek Revival houses in Georgia (U.S. state)
Houses completed in 1835
Houses in Brooks County, Georgia
Buildings and structures demolished in 1987
National Register of Historic Places in Brooks County, Georgia
Plantations in Georgia (U.S. state)